Camilla Trinchieri (born 1942) is an Italian-American mystery writer and novelist. She has published under three names: Camilla Trinchieri, Trella Crespi, and Camilla T. Crespi.

Biography
Daughter of an Italian diplomat and an American expatriate from Panama, she worked in the Italian film industry before moving to New York City in 1980. She became a U.S. citizen in 1997.

Trinchieri, a graduate of Barnard College and Columbia University, published her first novel, The Trouble with a Small Raise, in 1991. In 2017, she won the Italian American Studies Association Book Award for Seeking Alice, published in 2016.

Bibliography
As Camilla Trinchieri:
 The Price of Silence (2007) 
 Seeking Alice (2016)
The Tuscan Mystery Series
 Murder in Chianti (2020)
 The Bitter Taste of Murder (2021)
 Murder on the Vine (2022)

As Trella Crespi: (Simona Griffo Mystery Series)
 The Trouble with a Small Raise (1991)
 The Trouble with Moonlighting (1991)
 The Trouble with Too Much Sun (1992)
As Camilla T. Crespi:
 The Trouble with Thin Ice (1993)
 The Trouble with Going Home (1995)
 The Trouble with a Bad Fit: A Novel of Food, Fashion and Mystery (1996)
 The Trouble with a Hot Summer (1997)
 The Breakfast Club Murder (2014)

References

1942 births
Living people
20th-century American women writers
21st-century American women writers
Barnard College alumni
Columbia University alumni
Writers from New York City
American mystery novelists
20th-century pseudonymous writers
21st-century pseudonymous writers
Pseudonymous women writers